Kamianka (Urum: Йаны Карани) is a village in Volnovakha Raion (district) in Donetsk Oblast of eastern Ukraine, at 86.1 km SSW from the centre of Donetsk city.

Demographics
Native language as of the Ukrainian Census of 2001:
Ukrainian — 1.9%
Russian 97.24%
Greek — 0.29%

References

Villages in Volnovakha Raion